Quirima (or Kirima) is a town and municipality in the province of Malanje (Malange) in Angola.

Quirima is bordered to the north by the municipality of Cambundi-Catembo, to the east by the municipality of Cacolo, to the south by the municipality of Cuemba, and to the west by the municipality of Luquembo.

The municipality contains the comunas (communes) of Quirima and Sauter.

References

Populated places in Malanje Province
Municipalities of Angola